Captain Sindbad is a 1963 independently made fantasy and adventure film, produced by Frank King and Herman King, directed by Byron Haskin, that stars Guy Williams and Heidi Brühl. The film was shot at the Bavaria Film studios in Germany and was distributed by Metro-Goldwyn-Mayer.

The screenplay was rewritten by Guy Endore, then rewritten again by co-producer Frank King a week before filming began in order to reduce production expenses; the film was reedited again prior to release. Haskin also shot some of the film's special effects sequences for an MGM Television television pilot, but no network picked it up.

Plot
The peaceful kingdom of Baristan is ruled by the evil El Kerim. He plans to capture his rival, Sindbad, who will soon return from a voyage to marry Princess Jana. The Princess convinces the magician Galgo to turn her into a Firebird, so that she may fly off to warn Sindbad of the trap set for him. She is able to do so, just as Galgo is discovered by the guards, who take him to El Kerim. As Sindbad and his crew sail towards Baristan, the Princess/Firebird lands aboard their ship.

Before she can deliver the message, however, El Kerim has his guards transformed into giant human falcons, which manage to sink Sindbad's ship using large rocks. Sindbad and some of his crew survive the attack and carefully make their way ashore. Galgo stretches out his arm over a long distance in order to steal El Kerim's magic ring. El Kerim, however, wakes up in time and burns Galgo's hand using a nearby oil lamp.

Sindbad, posing as a petty thief so he can arrested, is taken before the evil ruler as planned. El Kerim is not fooled by the pretense and orders him to be executed. Sindbad breaks free and stabs him directly in the heart with a sword, but El Kerim cannot be killed, protected by one of Galgo's magic spells. He orders Sindbad be put to death in the public arena the next day.

Sindbad must now do battle with a giant invisible creature. Fortunately, it knocks over two large braizzers in its pursuit, starting a large fire. This incites a mass exodus of the arena's large crowd, allowing Sindbad to escape during the confusion that follows.

Sindbad goes to Galgo and finally convinces the magician to reveal El Kerim's secret: The evil ruler had his vulnerable heart removed, and it is now kept safe in a distant tower, guarded by supernatural forces. In the meantime, El Kerim insists that the Princess marry him, but when she finally refuses, he orders her to be executed at dawn. Sindbad and his men must traverse a swamp of horror in order to reach the tower containing the evil heart. They encounter carnivorous hanging vines, gigantic crocodiles, fiery volcanic lava pits, and boiling whirlpools. With their numbers reduced, they finally arrive at the tower, where they must dispatch a huge dragon-like creature with nine heads in order to enter.

Sindbad, with the aid of a hook, begins climbing the tower's immense rope, which rings a huge warning gong, alerting El Kerim. When he reaches the top, Sindbad discovers the still beating heart is encased in crystal. It is protected by a giant gloved hand, which pursues Sindbad around the chamber, until he throws the hook at the crystal, dislodging the heart. This causes El Kerim to suffer a heart attack. Seeking to protect his vulnerable heart, El Kerim rapidly flies to the tower with Galgo in a winged chariot. Just as Sindbad is about to impale the evil heart, El Kerim arrives. A fierce sword duel between them begins. Galgo tosses the heart over the side of the tower and it explodes upon hitting the ground. El Kerim stumbles and dies, and his body falls over the tall tower's edge.

Later, amid much pomp and circumstance, the entire kingdom celebrates the marriage of Captain Sindbad and Princess Jana.

Cast
 Guy Williams as Captain Sindbad
 Heidi Brühl as Princess Jana 
 Pedro Armendáriz as El Kerim
 Abraham Sofaer as Galgo
 Bernie Hamilton as Quinius 
 Helmuth Schneider as Bendar
 Margaret Jahnen as Lady-in-Waiting
 Rolf Wanka as The King
 Walter Barnes as Rolf
 James Dobson as Iffritch
 Maurice Marsac as Ahmed
 Henry Brandon as Colonel Kabar
 John Crawford as Aram
 Geoffrey Toone as Mohar
 Lawrence Montaigne as Jafar

Production
The film was shot at the Bavaria Studios in Munich with sets designed by the art directors Isabella Schlichting and Werner Schlichting. Outtakes of the film's "Dragon-Ogre" were used briefly in the film Natural Born Killers.

Reception

New York Times review, July 4, 1963

"Until about the last 20 minutes, it's strictly a broad mishmash of fantasy-comedy, spilling out over some lavishly gaudy sets of Old Arabia. As for plot, there's sinewy Sindbad (Guy Williams) trying to rescue a dead pan princess (Heidi Bruhl) from a wicked ruler (Pedro Armendariz), aided by a tippling, belching old magician".

"Throw in a tired "Scheherazade"-type of score, as Mr. Williams braves anything from crocodiles to a 12-headed monster (our count, anyway), and you have the kind of harmless trash some kids may tolerate".

"Yesterday, a cute little blonde in front of us took it all in stride, monsters included. She also perked up, leaning forward, for that final reel, when the picture slips from mediocrity into a wildly funny, eerie and casually beguiling adventure, not hard to take".

"One set, a garishly tangled swamp, is nifty; so is the final one, for a palace skirmish. The King Brothers produced it, in Munich, of all places. M.G.M. sponsors".

Comic book adaptation
 Gold Key: Captain Sindbad (September 1963)

References

External links
 

1963 films
1960s fantasy adventure films
American fantasy adventure films
West German films
English-language German films
Films directed by Byron Haskin
1960s children's fantasy films
German fantasy adventure films
Films based on Sinbad the Sailor
Seafaring films
Films set in the 8th century
Metro-Goldwyn-Mayer films
Films shot in Germany
Films adapted into comics
Films shot at Bavaria Studios
1960s historical adventure films
German historical films
Films scored by Michel Michelet
1960s English-language films
1960s American films
1960s German films